"Caminando"  is a song written and produced  by Amaia Montero for her 2011 album 2. It was released the first single to be released from her 2011 album. It was premiered on September 17, 2011, on the Spanish radio station Los 40 Principales and was released on September 20, 2011, on iTunes.

References

2011 songs